The 5 Peaks Challenge is a hill climbing challenge the aim of which is to ascend and descend the highest peak in each of England, Northern Ireland, Scotland and Wales (of the United Kingdom) and the Republic of Ireland within 48 hours, including all travelling, and without breaking national speed limits or recommended driving times. It is an extension of the National Three Peaks Challenge, which includes the highest peaks in England, Scotland and Wales.

The five peaks are:
Scafell Pike , in England
Slieve Donard , in Northern Ireland
Carrauntoohil , in the Republic of Ireland
Ben Nevis , in Scotland
Snowdon , in Wales

Ian McKeever along with Niall Kavanagh, Cathal Cregg and Lorcan Sweetnan set the world record in the Five Peaks Challenge, on 25 June 2004 climbing and descending all five peaks in 16 hours 16 minutes

References

Peak bagging in Ireland
Challenge walks
Peak bagging in the United Kingdom